Lecithocera leucoceros is a moth in the family Lecithoceridae. It was described by Edward Meyrick in 1932. It is found in Japan and China.

References

Moths described in 1932
leucoceros